Soft Girl or Softie describes a youth subculture that emerged among teenagers around mid-to late-2019. Soft girl is a fashion style, popular among some young women on social media, based on a deliberately cutesy, feminine look with a girly girl attitude. Being a soft girl also may involve a tender, sweet and vulnerable personality. The trend consists mainly of pastel colors, Y2K, anime, K-pop, and 90s-inspired clothing, as well as cute and nostalgic prints. It parallels some of the Kawaii-centric aesthetics in Japan, but with a more subdued look.

The soft girl aesthetic is a subculture that found predominant popularity through the social media app TikTok. Singer and songwriter Ariana Grande has been credited with popularizing the soft girl aesthetic.

See also
 Fairy Kei
 Girly girl
 Gyaru
 Kawaii fashion
 Barbiecore
 VSCO girl
 Scene (subculture)
 E-girls and e-boys

References

2010s fashion
2020s fashion
Internet memes introduced in 2019
2020s in Internet culture
TikTok
2019 neologisms
Youth culture